Futuna is an island in the Pacific Ocean occupying an area of  with a population of 10,912. It belongs to the French overseas collectivity (collectivité d'outre-mer, or COM) of Wallis and Futuna. It is one of the Hoorn Islands or Îles Horne; nearby Alofi is the other. They are both remnants of the same ancient, extinct volcano, now bordered with a fringing reef.

Futuna is where Pierre Chanel was martyred in 1841, becoming Polynesia's only Catholic saint. The cathedral of Poi now stands on the site where he was martyred. 

Futuna takes its name from an endonym derived from the local futu, meaning fish-poison tree.

Geography
The population was 3,225 (as of the 2018 census); 1,950 reside in Alo district and 1,275 in Sigave.

Climate
Futuna (Maopoopo weather station) has a tropical rainforest climate (Köppen climate classification Af).

History
Futuna and Alofi were put on the European maps in 1616 by Willem Schouten and Jacob Le Maire during their circumnavigation of the globe on the ship Eendracht. After sailing to Niuafoou, they suddenly changed course from west to northwest and discovered the two islands. They called it Hoorn Eylanden, after the city of Hoorn, Schouten's birthplace. This became Horne in French and English. They found a beautiful bay, a natural harbor along the southwest coast of Futuna, which they named after their ship as Eendrachts baai (Unity Bay). It is thought that their landing place was the site of the Anse de Sigave near what is today called Leava. 

Schouten and Le Maire had learned from earlier experiences how to approach islanders successfully. Upon landing, they went ashore, and, when approached by some of the natives, they made a show of force. This opened the way a peaceful barter, with the natives offering coconuts, yams, and hogs in exchange for the sailors’ iron nails, beads and knives. They went on to get fresh water and meet the king, who told his subjects that their guests were not to be disturbed by petty thieving. In this amiable way, the Dutch sailors were able to replenish their stocks. A few days after they arrived, the king of the other island, Alofi, came to visit, bringing with him 300 men. The two kings were extremely courteous to each other, and a great feast was prepared. A kava ceremony and umu were organised. Schouten and Le Maire were probably the first Europeans ever to witness these ceremonials, and the description they gave still rings familiar today.

Not having been bothered by thieving or hostilities, Schouten and Le Maire were able to study Futuna more thoroughly than had been possible for them in the case of the Niua islands. They did not visit Alofi. Their description of the islanders’ appearance and behavior was not flattering. Although they praise the men for being well-proportioned, they found the women ugly and ill-shaped, with breasts hanging down to their bellies like empty satchels. The people were said to all go naked, and to copulate in public, even in front of their king.

In the 19th century, whaling ships from the United States and elsewhere called at Futuna for water, wood, and food. The first one known to have called was the Independence in 1827.

Culture

Two kings, elected from the local nobility every few years, rule the population in conjunction with French authorities. They are the king of Sigave, the western province, and the king of Alo, the eastern province including Alofi. Except for Poi all villages are along the southwest coast, and they are from west to east: Toloke, Fiua, Vaisei, Nuku, and Leava (capital with the wharf) in Sigave, and Taoa, Malae, Ono, Kolia and Vele (at the airstrip) in Alo.

99% of the population of Wallis and Futuna are Catholic. Although the island is closer to Tonga and farther from Samoa than Uvea, the vernacular and culture are more Samoan. The languages spoken are Futunan and French.

Education
There are six primary schools on Futuna. The island also has two junior high schools (collèges): Fiua de Sigave and Sisia d'Ono. Residents are served by a senior high school/sixth-form college, Lycée d'Etat de Wallis et Futuna, on Wallis.

See also
 Pointe Vele Airport
 Peter Chanel

References

References
Cartes institut géographique national (4902F)
https://www.worldometers.info/world-population/wallis-and-futuna-islands-population/
Robert Kerr (1824): Voyage round the world, in 1615-1617, by William Cornelison Schouten and Jacques le Maire, going round Cape Horn. The comments of the editor to the original ship's journals are completely wrong, however.
Percy Smith (1892): "Futuna; or, Horne Island and its People", Journal of the Polynesian Society, vol.1, pp. 33–52

Islands of Wallis and Futuna
Volcanoes of the Pacific Ocean
Island countries
Former kingdoms